On 17 February 2023, a group of Islamic State insurgents attacked a large group of truffle farmers and their Syrian Army escort in the desert, southwest of the town of Al-Sukhnah in Homs Governorate, Syria. At least 61 civilians and seven Syrian soldiers were killed in the attack. It was one of the deadliest attacks since the 2018 As-Suwayda attacks.

The massacre occurred shortly after a previous IS attack in the area, in which 16 civilians were abducted and killed by the jihadist group. IS took advantage of the annual harvest of the desert fungus delicacy, which generally runs from February to April, to carry out attacks in remote locations.

References 

2023 murders in Asia
2020s murders in Syria
21st-century mass murder in Syria
Crime in Homs Governorate
February 2023 crimes in Asia
February 2023 events in Syria
Homs Governorate in the Syrian civil war
ISIL terrorist incidents in Syria
Terrorist incidents during the Syrian civil war
Terrorist incidents in Asia in 2023
Terrorist incidents in Syria in the 2020s